Sakchi was a village in north eastern Indian territory of Singhbhum which was selected by Jamsetji Tata to be the location of a planned steel city, which in 1919 became Jamshedpur.  Sakchi is now part of the city between the Tata Steel site and the river Subarnarekha. Then it was known as Kalimati. Due to the presence of iron ore, river water and sand, Jamsetji Tata decided to establish TISCO (Tata Iron and Steel Company Limited) there. The company is now known as Tata Steel Ltd.

Overview

Even today running through Sakchi is the Kalimati Road. During British India, a railway line connecting Jamshedpur to Howrah (Calcutta) was started. Jamshedpur is in the Indian mineral-rich state of Jharkhand which was earlier in Bihar as South Bihar.

As Tata Steel was established, the first planned urban settlement started in Sakchi Area and it included businessmen (Gujaratis, Parsis, Punjabis), servicemen (Biharis, Bengalis, Oriyas, Telugus, Tamils, Malayalis). Many people who then migrated from West Bengal, East Bengal (now Bangladesh), Gujarat, Assam are now permanent residents of Jamshedpur city and their ancestral homes were either lost or sold after separation of East Pakistan (Bangladesh). Old houses of Bengalis, Parsis, Anglo-Indians and Gujaratis can still be seen in Aambagan, Hill Cart Road, Kalimati Road, Pennar road, Sakchi Bazar areas of Sakchi. A few such homes are also present in Bistupur.

According to some people who had seen Tatanagar 80–90 years ago as children, today where the Aambagan Maidan lies near the present Masjid, there used to be a single line railway track which would carry sand for the factory. It does not exist anymore.
Mode of transport in the Jamshedpur city were buggies and taxis. There were single lane roads with old British style street lamps. Most roads between Sakchi and Bistupur were surrounded by jungles.

The city is unique because it is a very small town even today with extreme ends being covered within 45 minutes (including traffic). It is not a metro city, yet it has the demography of a metro town as people from all ethnicities live here as permanent residents. Sakchi is located in the centre of the city, with Bistupur, Kadma, and Sonari lying on its west. On its east lies Baradwari, Kasidih, Bhalubasa, Sitaramdera, Agrico and Sidhgora. On its north lies Mango which is also one of the busiest locations of the city and down south lies Burmamines, Tatanagar station, Jugsalai and Parsudih.

Sakchi today has numerous cinema halls, Sakchi Bazaar which holds Mangla Market (Tuesday market) every Tuesday on footpath. Sakchi Market (or Sakchi Bazaar) is the oldest market in the city.

Civic administration
There is a police station at Sakchi.

References

Jamshedpur